Thomas Bramston  (c.1690–1765), of Skreens, near Maldon, Essex, was a British lawyer and Tory politician who sat in the House of Commons from 1727 to 1747.

Bramston was the eldest surviving son  of Antony Bramston of Skreens and his wife Catherine Nutt, daughter. of Sir Thomas Nutt of Mays, Sussex. and the grandson of Sir John Bramston, former MP for Essex and Maldon.  He was admitted at Middle Temple in 1707 and at Pembroke College, Cambridge on 11 October 1707. In 1714 he was called to the bar. On succeeding his father to Skreens in 1722, he also became  High steward of Maldon. He married Diana Ferne widow of Robert Ferne of Locke, Derbyshire and daughter  of Edward Turner of Stoke, Lincolnshire. Diana died on 10 January 1726 and he married as his second wife   Elizabeth Berney, daughter of Richard Berney, recorder of Norwich, in January 1733 

At the 1727 British general election, Bramston was returned unopposed as Member of Parliament for Maldon replacing Thomas Bramston of Writtle with whom his political career has sometimes been conflated. Bramston made his first recorded speech opposing the Address on 7 May 1728 and again opposed the Address on 21 January 1729. On 26 January 1730, he seconded a motion calling for information as to any engagements entered into for the hire of foreign troops. On 11 March  1730, he moved for ‘an address to the King for a particular account of the £60,000 granted last year for to make good the engagements with foreign princes’, but Walpole avoided the question through parliamentary procedure. Also in 1730 he carried a bill which resulted in the release of about 10,000 insolvent debtors. He supported a place bill on 17 February 1731.

In 1732 Bramston was responsible for an  Act requiring a land qualification for Justices of the Peace, after complaints that several JPs had no fortunes, and some were not able to write or read. In a debate on the Excise Bill in 1733 he gave described several oppressive acts which to his knowledge the officers of the excise had been guilty of in his neighbourhood. At the 1734 British general election he was defeated at Maldon, but was returned in a contest as MP for  Essex. He spoke against the practice of forcing householders and innkeepers to maintain the soldiers quartered on them. He was returned unopposed as MP for  Essex at the 1741 British general election. When the Jacobites in France were preparing for an invasion in February 1744, Bramston was described to the French Government as a ‘gentilhomme d’un grand crédit dans la province d’Essex où les troupes doivent débarquer’, and he was expected to have led a rising of the Essex Jacobites planned to coincide with the invasion which did not materialize. In spring 1745 he assisted in the passing of an Act for the stricter enforcement of his own Act of 1732, concerning justices of the peace. He did not stand again 1747 British general election. The 2nd Lord Egmont included him among Members whom it would be essential to bring back into the House on the accession of Frederick, Prince of Wales. He became a Bencher of Middle Temple in 1742.

Bramston died  on 14 November 1765 leaving a son and two daughters.

References

1690s births
1765 deaths
Members of the Parliament of Great Britain for English constituencies
British MPs 1727–1734
British MPs 1734–1741
British MPs 1741–1747